The name Donna has been used for two tropical cyclones worldwide:

In the Atlantic:
 Hurricane Donna (1960)

In the South Pacific:
 Cyclone Donna (2017)

Atlantic hurricane set index articles
South Pacific cyclone set index articles